Mings is a surname. Notable people with the surname include:

 Christopher Myngs (1625–1666), English naval officer and privateer 
 Tyrone Mings (born 1993), English footballer

See also
 Ming (surname)